Henry Wanjune Lin (born 1995) is an American student who won the $50,000 Intel Young Scientist award, the second-highest award at the 2013 Intel Science and Engineering Fair for his work with MIT professor Michael McDonald on simulations of galaxy clusters. In 2015, he was named one of Forbes' 30 under 30 scientists.

He is a 2012 alumnus of the Research Science Institute and a 2013 alumnus of the International Summer School for Young Physicists (ISSYP) at Perimeter Institute for Theoretical Physics. In November 2013, he gave a TED talk on clusters of galaxies in New Orleans, LA.

Together with Harvard astronomy chair Abraham Loeb and atmospheric scientist Gonzalo Gonzalez Abad, Lin proposed a novel way to search for extraterrestrial intelligence by targeting exoplanets with industrial pollution. Lin's unconventional work also includes proposing a statistical theory of human population which explains Zipf's Law and proposing a novel test for panspermia in the galaxy.

He is currently a physics graduate student at Princeton University.

References

Further reading
 ABC News
 Red River Radio
 Science News
 New Scientist
 Boston Globe
 Gizmodo
 International Business Times
 News.com.au

External links
 

1995 births
Living people
American astronomers
American people of Taiwanese descent